Lindmania guianensis is a plant species in the genus Lindmania. This species is native to Venezuela and Guyana.

Two varieties are recognized:
Lindmania guianensis var. guianensis - Guyana, Bolívar
Lindmania guianensis var. vestita (L.B.Sm.) L.B.Sm. - Venezuela

References

guianensis
Flora of Guyana
Plants described in 1856
Flora of Venezuela